Hildur Alice Nilsson (26 January 1924 – 11 February 2014), known by her stage name Alice Babs, was a Swedish singer and actress. She worked in a wide number of genres – Swedish folklore, Elizabethan songs and opera. While she was best known internationally as a jazz singer, Babs also competed as Sweden's first annual competition entrant in the Eurovision Song Contest 1958. In 1972 she was named Sweden's Royal Court Singer, the first non-opera singer as such.

Career 
After making her breakthrough in the film Swing it, magistern! ('Swing It, Teacher!', 1940), she appeared in more than a dozen Swedish-language films. Despite being cast as the well-behaved, good-hearted, cheerful girl, the youth culture forming with Babs as its icon caused outrage among members of the older generation. A vicar called the Babs cult the "foot and mouth disease of cultural life".

A long and productive period of collaboration with Duke Ellington began in 1963. Among other works, Babs participated in performances of Ellington's second and third Sacred Concerts which he had written originally for her. Her voice had a range of more than three octaves; Ellington said that when she was not available to sing the parts that he had written for her, he had to use three different singers.

In 1963, her recording of "After You've Gone" (Fontana) reached No. 29 on the British New Musical Express charts.

In 1972, she contributed to the recording of "Auntie", a Dutch song commemorating the beginning of British Broadcasting Corporation's radio broadcasts 50 years before.

Personal life 

In 1943, Babs married Nils Ivar Sjöblom (1919–2011). Their three children are Lilleba Sjöblom Lagerbäck (born 1945), Lars-Ivar (Lasse) Sjöblom (born 1948), and Titti Sjöblom (born 1949).

Between 1973 and 2004, Babs and her husband resided in Costa del Sol, Spain, while still working in Sweden and internationally. In their later years, they returned to Sweden.

Awards 
She was awarded the Illis quorum by the government of Sweden in 2003.

Death 
Babs died of complications from Alzheimer's disease at age 90 on 11 February 2014 in Stockholm.

Filmography

Discography 

Alice Babs' discography includes more than 800 recordings since her debut with Joddlarflickan in 1939.  The following is a list of her recordings available on CD, listed chronologically from when they were originally recorded.
Vax Records	CD 1003	Alice Babs & Nisse Linds Hot-trio, originally recorded: 1939–41
Naxos	8.120759	Swingflickan, originally recorded: 1939–44
Vax Records	CD 1000	Early recordings 1939–1949
Klara skivan	KLA 7802-2	Joddlarflickan (2 CDs), originally recorded: 1939–51
Phontastic	PHONTCD 9302	Swing it! Alice Babs!, originally recorded: 1939–53
Sonora	548493-2	Swing it, Alice! (2 CDs), originally recorded: 1939–63
Sonora	529315-2	Ett glatt humör, originally recorded: 1940–42
Odeon	7C138-35971/2	Alice Babs, originally recorded: 1942–1947
Metronome	8573-84676-2	Guldkorn, originally recorded: 1951–58
Metronome	4509-93189-2	Metronomeåren, originally recorded: 1951–58
Metronome	5050467-1616-2-7	Alice Babs bästa (2 CDs), originally recorded: 1951–61
Bear Family	BCD 15809-AH	Mitsommernacht, originally recorded: 1953–59
Bear Family	BCD 15814-AH	Lollipop, originally recorded: 1953–59
EMI	7243-5-96148-2-3	Diamanter (2 CDs), originally recorded: 1958–60
EMI	7243-5-20153-2-0	Just you, just me, originally recorded: 1958–72
Pickwick	751146	Regntunga skyar, originally recorded: 1958–72
Metronome	4509-95438-2	Swe-Danes Scandinavian Shuffle, originally recorded: 1959
RCA	74321-12719-2	Alice and Wonderband, originally recorded: 1959
Real Gone Music RGM-0496  Serenade to Sweden, Alice Babs and Duke Ellington, originally recorded: 1963
Swedish Society Discofil	SWECD 401	Sjung med oss mamma (Alice Tegnér), originally recorded: 1963
Swedish Society Discofil	SWECD 400	Alice Babs, originally recorded: 1964
Swedish Society Discofil	SWECD 402	Scandinavian songs (Svend Asmussen) originally recorded: 1964
Prophone	PCD 050	Yesterday, originally recorded: 1966–75
Vax Records VAXCD 1006 "Illusion" (with Jan Johansson and Georg Riedels orchestra) Originally recorded 1966
Vax Records CD 1008 "As time goes by" Alice Babs with Bengt Hallbergs trio and Arne Domnérus Big Band with Svend Asmussen. Originally recorded 1960–1969
EMI	7243 5398942 2 	Den olydiga ballongen/Hej du måne, originally recorded: 1968–76
Prophone	PCD 045	What a joy!, originally recorded: 1972–80
Bluebell	ABCD 052	There's something about me, originally recorded: 1973–78
Prophone	PCD 021	Serenading Duke Ellington, originally recorded: 1974–75
Swedish Society Discofil	SCD 3003	Om sommaren sköna – Sjunger Alice Tegnér, originally recorded: 1974
Bluebell	ABCD 005	Far away star, originally recorded: 1977
RCA Victor	74321-62363-2	Swingtime again, originally recorded: 1998
Sony	SK 61797	A church blues for Alice, originally recorded: 1999
Four Leaf Clover Records FLCDVD 8001 Swingtime Again with Charlie Norman recorded 1999
Prophone	PCD 062	Don't be blue, originally recorded: 2001
Vax Records	Vi Minns Alice Babs released: 2014

Citations

Sources

Further reading

External links 

 
 

1924 births
2014 deaths
20th-century Swedish women singers
Singers with a three-octave vocal range
Deaths from Alzheimer's disease
Deaths from dementia in Sweden
Duke Ellington Orchestra members
Eurovision Song Contest entrants of 1958
Melodifestivalen winners
People from Kalmar
RCA Victor artists
Eurovision Song Contest entrants for Sweden
Swedish film actresses
Swedish jazz singers
Swe-Danes members
English-language singers from Sweden
Recipients of the Illis quorum
Swedish people of Walloon descent